Gabrielle Hamilton (1923–2014) was a British actress who performed in TV movies and series from 1953 to 2014.

She also worked extensively in theatre, including the Royal Shakespeare Company and at Oxford. Her facial and vocal similarities to Joan Hickson additionally saw her play Agatha Christie's Miss Marple on stage.

She died in 2014, aged 91.

References

External links

British television actresses
1923 births
2014 deaths
People from Edmonton, London
Royal Shakespeare Company members